Chas. Floyd Johnson (born Charles Floyd Johnson) is an African American television producer, actor and activist, known for The Rockford Files (1975-1980), Magnum, P.I. (1982-1988), and Red Tails (2012). A three-time Emmy Award winner (and seven-time nominee), Johnson currently serves as Executive Producer of the CBS Television Studios' television series, NCIS (2003-2019), following his tenure as an executive producer of the long-running CBS television series, JAG (1997-2005).

Early life
A native of Camden, New Jersey, Johnson spent most of his childhood in Middletown, Delaware. His mother, Bertha Ellen Seagers, was a school principal and teacher, and his father, Orange Maull Johnson, was a realtor. In 1956, he entered The Stony Brook School as the second African American student, graduating in 1958. Johnson received both his Bachelor of Arts and his Juris Doctor Degrees from Howard University.

Career
The Vietnam draft brought Johnson to the United States Army, stationed at Fort Dix, New Jersey. Because of his law degree, Johnson was assigned to the Courts and Boards Defense Counsel. Once his military service was completed, Johnson relocated to Washington, D.C., and joined the U.S. Copyright Office. During this period as a copyright lawyer, Johnson took various film and acting classes in his free time. He also got acting roles in local theatre and in various film/television projects.

Deciding to focus on a career in entertainment, Johnson left the copyright office and moved to Los Angeles in 1971 . Once in Los Angeles, Johnson immersed himself in the Los Angeles entertainment scene. Johnson took more acting and film/television production classes.

He got a position in the mail room at Universal Studios. After just two days, Johnson applied for a newly opened position and became a Production Coordinator. While in this role for a variety of television shows, Johnson caught the attention of Stephen J. Cannell and Meta Rosenberg. They were the Producers of The Rockford Files.  This led to the big break that would kick-off Johnson's professional producer career: he became the show's second Associate Producer in 1974.

Along with Robert Hooks, Brock Peters, and Denise Nicholas, Johnson was a founding member of The Media Forum and he served as a former vice president. He was a vice president of Communications Bridge, a Los Angeles training program for minority students in the fields of Film and Television Production. He is a member of the Caucus for Producers, Writers and Directors, the Academy of Television Arts & Sciences, the Screen Actors Guild, the Writers Guild of America and the Producers Guild of America, for which he previously served, for many years, as both an officer and a member of its board of directors. With the Producers Guild, he founded and produced the Oscar Micheaux Awards, which was the forerunner of the PGA's "Celebration of Diversity Awards".

Johnson is also a co-author (along with George H. Hill and Lorraine Raglin) of the book, Black Women in Television: An Illustrated History and Bibliography, published in 1990.

Awards
Johnson has received several notable awards.

Primetime Emmys
 Outstanding Drama Series - Winner - The Rockford Files - 1978
 Outstanding Drama Series - Nominee - The Rockford Files - 1979
 Outstanding Drama Series - Nominee - Magnum, P.I. - 1983
 Outstanding Drama Series - Nominee - Magnum, P.I. - 1984

Johnson produced and performed in the 1982 KCET Public Television Special, Voices of Our People … in Celebration of Black Poetry, where he received an Emmy Award for “Outstanding Performer in an Entertainment Special” and another Emmy Award for “Outstanding Entertainment Special.”

Other recent awards include the Producer of the Year for NCIS (CBS), the Chairman's Award and the Lifetime Achievement Award from the Caucus for Producers, Writers & Directors, the Diversity Award from the Producers Guild of America and the Ron Brown Award from Minorities in Broadcasting.

Acting and production credits

Stage appearances 
 Alton Scales, The Sign in Sidney Brustein's Window, Theatre Lobby, Washington, DC, 1967
 Focus on Blacks in American Theatre, Back Alley Theatre, Washington, DC, 1967
 Bernard, The Boys in the Band, Morgan Theatre, Santa Monica, CA, 1972
 Lieutenant, The Drumhead, Merle Oberon Theatre, Los Angeles, 1974

Television work 

Executive producer; with others; series
 (And associate producer and producer) The Rockford Files (also known as Jim Rockford, Private Investigator), NBC, 1974-1980
 Magnum, P.I., CBS, 1987-1988
 B.L. Stryker, ABC, 1989-1990
 Quantum Leap, NBC, 1992-1993
 (With Donald P. Bellisario) JAG, CBS, 1996-2005
 NCIS, CBS, 2003-2019

Producer; with others; series
 Magnum, P.I., CBS, 1980-1984
 (With Mark Horowitz, and with Gordon Dawson) Bret Maverick (also known as Bret Maverick: The Lazy Ace), NBC, 1981-1982
 (With Phil DeGuere) Simon & Simon, CBS, 1982-1983
 (Supervising producer) Magnum, P.I., CBS, 1985-1986

Executive producer; with others; movies
 Auntie Sue (B.L. Stryker episode), 1989
 The Dancer's Touch (B.L. Stryker episode), 1989
 Die Laughing (B.L. Stryker episode), 1989
 The King of Jazz (B.L. Stryker episode), 1989
 Royal Gambit (B.L. Stryker episode), 1989
 (With James Garner) The Rockford Files: Murder and Misdemeanor, CBS, 1997

Film 

Producer
 Red Tails, 2012
 Get in the Way:  The Journey of John Lewis, 2016

References

External links
 
 
 

1941 births
Living people
American male television actors
African-American male actors
American male stage actors
African-American activists
20th-century American male actors
21st-century American male actors
Male actors from New Jersey
Actors from Camden, New Jersey
Howard University School of Law alumni
Howard University alumni
The Stony Brook School alumni
Television producers from New Jersey